Phireza is a genus of spiders in the family Thomisidae. It was first described in 1886 by Simon. , it contains only one Brazilian species, Phireza sexmaculata.

References

Thomisidae
Monotypic Araneomorphae genera
Spiders of Brazil